Coast Scene, Isles of Shoals is a 1901 painting by Childe Hassam which is in the collection of the Metropolitan Museum of Art.

Done in oil on canvas in luminous colours, the painting depicts the remote Isles of Shoals off the rocky shoreline of New England, a favorite haunt of Childe Hassam at the end of the 19th century and where he painted a series of similar coastal scenes.

The painting is accompanied at the Metropolitan Museum of Art by Surf, Isles of Shoals, a similar work by Hassam.

The work is currently (2018) not on view.

References

1901 paintings
Paintings in the collection of the Metropolitan Museum of Art
Paintings by Childe Hassam
Water in art